Myitkyina  District is a district of the Kachin State in northern Burma (Myanmar). The capital lies at Myitkyina. It is the largest district in the country by land area.

Townships
The district contains the following townships:

Myitkyina Township 
Waingmaw Township 
Injangyang Township
Tanai Township 
Chipwi Township
Hsawlaw Township

External links
 "Myitkyina District, Burma" SatelliteViews.net

 
Districts of Myanmar
Kachin State